Amanda's (also known as Amanda's by the Sea) is an American sitcom television series based on the 1970s British sitcom Fawlty Towers that aired on ABC from February 10 to May 26, 1983. The series starred Bea Arthur as Amanda Cartwright, who owns a seaside hotel called "Amanda's by the Sea" and was Arthur's first return to series television since her sitcom Maude ended in 1978.

A total of thirteen episodes were produced, with three remaining unaired following the series' cancellation.

Synopsis
Amanda Cartwright (Bea Arthur) is the formidable owner of "Amanda's by the Sea", a struggling California seaside hotel overlooking the Pacific Ocean whose fractious staff includes her hotel-management-graduate son Marty (Fred McCarren); her spoiled daughter-in-law Arlene (Simone Griffeth); Earl, the bumbling chef (Rick Hurst) and Aldo, the bellhop of foreign extraction (Tony Rosato).

The comedy revolved around burnt steaks, fussy guests, travel-guide writers who had to be impressed, the banker Mr. Mundy (Keene Curtis) who always threatened to foreclose and brother-in-law Zack (Kevin McCarthy), who was out to woo Amanda.

Production 
Amanda's is the second attempted American adaptation of Fawlty Towers. The first, Snavely (also known as Chateau Snavely) starring Harvey Korman and Betty White, was produced by ABC for a pilot in 1978, but the transfer from coastal hotel to highway motel proved too much and additional episodes were never filmed after the completion and review of that pilot. John Cleese, co-creator of the original British sitcom, was critical of this first adaptation, in particular Korman and White, saying they "played it too slow and were embarrassed by the edgy dialogue".

Amanda's was created by Elliot Shoenman, who had previously written six episodes of Arthur's 1970s sitcom Maude. Since Maude concluded in 1978, Arthur had been approached with numerous ideas, until Shoenman showed her some tapes of Fawlty Towers. Loving the original, Arthur agreed to take part in a remake. Later, however, she recalled "complaining bitterly" about the show and, in particular, the plot and character changes. Amanda, unlike her original counterpart Sybil, did not have a husband (she was a widow), but instead had a son and daughter-in-law. Arthur noted the only real similarity between Amanda's and Fawlty Towers was the adaptation of the character Manuel, known in the remake as Aldo. Norman Lear, a friend and former colleague of Arthur's, looked at the sitcom and told Arthur: "You don't have a character...you're not playing anything."

Cleese, in a 2009 interview, described the occasion when American television producers spoke to him about their development of Amanda's: Amanda's was taped in front of a live audience at ABC Studios in Hollywood, California. It was canceled in May 1983 after a short four-month run of ten episodes, with three episodes remaining unaired. A&E channel broadcast reruns of the show during the late 1980s.

Arthur later described the show as "a big disappointment". Two years after the cancellation of Amanda's, Arthur was cast in the sitcom The Golden Girls.

A third remake of Fawlty Towers, titled Payne, was developed sixteen years after Amanda's ended. Produced by and starring John Larroquette, that CBS series was canceled after the broadcast of its eighth episode on April 28, 1999.

Cast
Bea Arthur as Amanda Wilkerson Cartwright
Fred McCarren as Martin "Marty" Cartwright
Simone Griffeth as Arlene Cartwright
Tony Rosato as Aldo
Rick Hurst as Earl Nash
Keene Curtis as Clifford Mundy
Kevin McCarthy as Zackary Desmond "Zack" Cartwright

Episodes

Broadcast history

The series was shown in Italy, under the title Amanda in the 1980s on Rete 4. It was also shown in Sweden from June 15, 1984.

US television ratings

References

External links

1983 American television series debuts
1983 American television series endings
1980s American sitcoms
American Broadcasting Company original programming
American television series based on British television series
English-language television shows
Fawlty Towers
Fictional hotels
Television shows set in California
Television shows filmed in Los Angeles
Television series by CBS Studios